Okhochevka is a rural locality in Plotavsky Selsoviet Rural Settlement, Oktyabrsky District, Kursk Oblast, Russia. Population:

Geography 
The village is located on the Vorobzha River (a left tributary of the Seym River), 63 km from the Russia–Ukraine border, 27 km south-west of Kursk, 15 km south-west of the district center – the urban-type settlement Pryamitsyno, 2 km from the selsoviet center – Plotava.

 Climate
Okhochevka has a warm-summer humid continental climate (Dfb in the Köppen climate classification).

Transport 
Okhochevka is located 9 km from the federal route  Crimea Highway (a part of the European route ), 6 km from the road of regional importance  (Dyakonovo – Sudzha – border with Ukraine), 5 km from the road  ("Crimea Highway" – Ivanino, part of the European route ), 1 km from the road of intermunicipal significance  (38K-004 – Plotava), 14 km from the nearest railway halt 439 km (railway line Lgov I — Kursk).

The rural locality is situated 36 km from Kursk Vostochny Airport, 107 km from Belgorod International Airport and 232 km from Voronezh Peter the Great Airport.

References

Notes

Sources

Rural localities in Oktyabrsky District, Kursk Oblast